Acrocercops dinosticha is a moth of the family Gracillariidae, known from Java, Indonesia. It was described by Edward Meyrick in 1936. The larvae feed on Euphorbiaceae species.

References

dinosticha
Moths of Asia
Moths described in 1936